76, formerly Lions of '76, is a 2016 Nigerian historical fiction drama film directed by Izu Ojukwu and produced by Adonaijah Owiriwa and Izu Ojukwu. It stars Ramsey Nouah, Chidi Mokeme, Rita Dominic, and Ibinabo Fiberesima.

Set six years after the civil war, a young officer from the Middle Belt gets into a romantic relationship with an O-level student from the South-eastern region. However, their relationship is strained by constant military postings. The soldier gets accused of being involved in the unsuccessful 1976 military coup and assassination of General Murtala Mohammed, and the heavily pregnant wife gets entangled in an emotional dilemma.

The historical account in 76 went through a seven-month approval period at the Nigerian Military before filming started. The film, which is set in the 1970s, was shot in Ibadan, Oyo. The film, which was shot on 16-millimeter film with an Arriflex 416 camera, was in production for about five years.

Plot summary
Set six years after the civil war, a young officer from the Middle Belt, Joseph Dewa, gets into a romantic relationship with an O-level student, Suzanne, from the South-eastern region. However, their relationship is strained by constant military postings and Suzanne's family who constantly complained of not wanting to have anything to do with Joseph's people.

In a series of events that followed and betrayal of trust from Joseph's friend, Gomos, Joseph gets accused of being involved in the unsuccessful 1976 military coup and assassination of General Murtala Mohammed. His release will be based on his innocence by producing his Identity Card, which he could not do.

Suzanne goes through a lot of emotional pains, coupled with the delivery of a baby girl, as she does everything she can to prove her husband's innocence.

Cast
Ramsey Nouah as Captain Joseph Dewa
Chidi Mokeme as Major Gomos
Rita Dominic as Suzie
Ibinabo Fiberesima as Angela
Daniel K. Daniel as CPL Obi
Memry Savanhu as Eunice
Adonai Owiriwa as Captain V. M. Jaiye
Pat Nebo as Colonel Aliu
Nelly Ekwereogu as Ikenna
Shuaibu Ebenesi Adams as Lieutenant Jubril
Debo Oguns as Noel

Production
Ojukwu always had fantasies about making military movies, so much that he followed many coup stories. When the 76 project came along, he had to do a lot more readings and research, and also consult scholars on the crucial aspects of the story, to ensure historical accuracy; over a year was spent on the pre-production stage of the film. The historical account of 76 had the support of the Nigerian Military, as the script went through a seven-month investigation and approval period before filming started. The military also assigned personnel to train the actors and guide the military aspect of the film. During the film's development, the director tried to minimize violence as he wanted people to focus on the story and not get distracted or pissed off by gory images. Eight period cars of the 1970s were refurbished to be used in the film.

Filming took place mainly at Mokola Barracks, Ibadan, Oyo. The film was shot using Arriflex 416 Super 16 cameras; It was initially meant to be shot on 35mm film, but the ground glass of one of the cameras to be used got damaged. As a result, the director opted to shoot on 16mm film instead. The film stock used for filming, along with other equipment used for production, were subsidized by the Nigerian Film Corporation. After over four months on set, Principal photography was concluded during July 2012.

Release
A teaser trailer was released to the public on 20 November 2012 The release was initially slated for 4 October 2013, but it was pushed back indefinitely due to delayed post production. A first official trailer for the film was released on 14 November 2014. The film was selected to premiere at the Toronto International film Festival during September 2016, and at the BFI London Film Festival. The film was released on 25 November 2016.

Themes
Izu Ojukwu stated that "it's a story told from a dual point of view—from the soldier's patriotic perspective and from that of the officer's wives." Ojukwu also made it clear that the film paid homage to the strength of soldiers' wives: "As far as I'm concerned, the wives are the real soldiers.... They are the ones who suffer from whatever decisions their husbands make—whether on the battlefield or within their office complexes."

Issues reflected in the film include the rumours of foreign involvement in Murtala Muhammed's coup. Ojukwu stated: "You cannot run away from them.... You must deal with all the rumours—although we cannot say, factually, what happened...." The film also strongly portrayed intertribal marriages; 76 is set six years after the Nigerian Civil War, and, according to the director, this was an era when the Nigerian people started playing down on all forms of discrimination and saw themselves more as brothers and sisters.

References

External links 

 
 

2016 films
Nigerian drama films
English-language Nigerian films
Films set in 1976
Films shot in Ibadan
Films shot in Oyo
Films directed by Izu Ojukwu
2010s historical drama films
Films set in Nigeria
Igbo-language films
AMVCA Best Overall Film winners
Nigerian Civil War
2010s English-language films